Herberts may refer to:

 Herberts, New Jersey, United States
 The Herberts, Wales, United Kingdom
 Alfred Herbert (company) or Herbert's, British former machine tool manufacturing business
 Herberts Gmbh, a German chemical company specializing in protective coatings, now Axalta

See also
 Herbert (disambiguation)